was a  after Hōreki and before An'ei. This period spanned the years from June 1764 through November 1772.

Change of era
 1764 : The era name became Meiwa (meaning "Bright Harmony") because of the enthronement of Empress Go-Sakuramachi.

As a cultural phenomenon, the literature of this period records concerted attempts to distill the aggregate characteristics of the inhabitants of Edo (Edokko) into a generalized thumbnail description. These traits (Edokko katagi) were put into use to draw a contrast between Edokko and those who didn't have this "sophisticated" gloss -— those not from the city, as in merchants from the Kyoto-Osaka region or samurai from distant provinces. Sometimes Edokko katagi was presented with pride; and it was used mockingly.

Events of the Meiwa Era
 1765 (Meiwa 2): Five-momme coin issued.
 1766 (Meiwa 3): A planned insurrection to displace the Shōgun was thwarted.
 1768 (Meiwa 5): Five-momme usage halted.
 1770 (Meiwa 7): A typhoon flattened the newly built Imperial Palace in Kyoto.
 1770 (Meiwa 7): A great comet (Lexell's Comet) with a very long tail lit up the night skies throughout the summer and autumn.
 1770 (Meiwa 7): Although no one could have known it at the time, this was the first of 15 consecutive years of drought in Japan.
 April 1, 1772 (Meiwa 9, 29th day of the 2nd month): "The Great Meiwa Fire"—one of the three greatest Edo fire disasters. All this devastation subsequently engendered the staggering costs of reconstruction.
 August 2, 1772 (Meiwa 9, 4th day of the 6th month): A terrible tempest hit the Kantō bringing floods and ruining crops.
 August 17, 1772 (Meiwa 9, 19th day of the 6th month): Another storm with more flooding and winds no less intense blew down an estimated 4000 houses in Edo alone.
 1772 (Meiwa 9): At the time, it was said that "Meiwa 9 is Year of Trouble" because it was marked by an extraordinary succession of natural calamities. The pun was made linking the words "Meiwa" + "ku" (meaning "Meiwa 9") and the sound-alike word "meiwaku" (meaning "misfortune" or "annoyance").
 1772 (Meiwa 9,  11th month): The nengō was changed to Anei (meaning "eternal tranquillity"), but this symbolic act was proved futile.

Notes

References
 Hall, John Whitney. (1955). Tanuma Okitsugu, 1719-1788: Forerunner of Modern Japan. Cambridge: Harvard University Press.  OCLC  445621
 Nara, Hiroshi. (2004). The Structure of Detachment: the Aesthetic Vision of Kuki Shūzō with a translation of "Iki no kōzō." Honolulu: University of Hawaii Press. ; ;  OCLC 644791079
 Nussbaum, Louis Frédéric and Käthe Roth. (2005). Japan Encyclopedia. Cambridge: Harvard University Press. ; OCLC 48943301
 Screech, Timon. (2006). Secret Memoirs of the Shoguns: Isaac Titsingh and Japan, 1779-1822. London: RoutledgeCurzon. ; OCLC 65177072
 Titsingh, Isaac. (1834). Nihon Odai Ichiran; ou,  Annales des empereurs du Japon.  Paris: Royal Asiatic Society, Oriental Translation Fund of Great Britain and Ireland. OCLC 5850691.

External links 
 Lexell's Comet: -- Comet ("D/1770 L1") is named after Lexell.
 National Diet Library, "The Japanese Calendar" -- historical overview plus illustrative images from library's collection
 Toyohara Chikanobu, Mirror of the Ages (Jidai Kagami):  Meiwa no koro.

Japanese eras
1760s in Japan
1770s in Japan
1764 establishments in Japan